Adams Aliyu Oshiomhole (born 4 April 1952) is a Nigerian politician and the former National Chairman of the All Progressive Congress. He had previously served as the President of Nigeria Labour Congress from 1999 to 2007 and the executive governor of Edo State, Nigeria from 2008 to 2016.

As APC National Chairman, he was suspended from office by the Abuja Court of Appeal on 16 June 2020.

Background

Adams Aliyu Oshiomhole was born on 4 April 1952 at Iyamho, near Auchi in Edo State. He was born Muslim but was led into Christianity by his late wife Clara who died of cancer aged 54. He is Catholic and his Christian name is Eric. After his secondary education, he obtained a job with the Arewa Textiles Company, where he was elected union secretary. He became a full-time trade union organizer in 1975.

In May 2015 he married a young model called Lara Fortes.

Education
Adams Oshiomhole decided that he needed to further his education and so in 1975 he proceeded to Ruskin College at Oxford, United Kingdom to study industrial relations, majoring in labor economics. Furthermore, in 1989, he attended the National Institute for policy and strategic studies (NIPSS) Plateau state of Nigeria, making him a Member of the National Institute (MNI).

Career

Labor leader 
In 1982, Adams Oshiomhole was appointed General Secretary of the National Union of Textile, Garment and Tailoring Workers of Nigeria, a union with over 75,000 workers. After democracy was restored in 1999, he became president of the Nigerian Labour Congress and was prominent as the leader of a campaign of industrial action against high oil prices in Nigeria.
Early in the administration of President Olusegun Obasanjo he negotiated a 25% wage increase for public sector workers.
In return he publicly supported Obasanjo and endorsed his candidacy when he was re-elected in 2003.
The Textile union elected Oshiomhole for a second term as General Secretary, while he continued as president of the NLC (Nigeria Labor Congress).

His relationship with Obasanjo turned sour as neglect of local oil refineries led to the reliance on imported gasoline, followed by rises in the price of fuel. Oshiomhole led strikes and demonstrations against the increase. He faced arrests, tear gas and temporary blockades of union offices, and Obasanjo introduced legislation to make it more difficult for the NLC to strike.
The NLC alleged that on 9 October 2004 Oshiomhole was abducted by State Security Services during a protest, but the Nigerian government said he submitted to voluntary custody.

Oshiomhole represented African workers for two terms on the Governing Body of the International Labour Organization (ILO), serving on the committee on Freedom of Association. He was also a member of the executive board of the International Confederation of Free Trade Unions.

Politics 
In April 2007, Adams Oshiomhole ran for Governor of Edo State under the Action Congress Party, with which his Labour Party had entered a strategic alliance.
Oserheimen Osunbor of the People's Democratic Party (PDP) was declared the winner.
However, the AC contested the election on the basis of various irregularities.
On 20 March 2008, an Edo State election tribunal nullified the election of Oserheimen Osunbor and declared Oshiomhole the winner. On 11 November 2008, a federal Appeal Court sitting in Benin City upheld the ruling of the state's elections petitions tribunal, declaring Oshiomole to be the Governor of Edo State.
The decision was based on several voting irregularities.

During the 2012 Edo State gubernatorial election, he was elected to a second term, winning the elections in a massive landslide. He ended his tenure on the 12th day of November 2016.

On 23 June 2018, Adams Oshiomhole emerged as the national chairman of the All Progressives Congress (APC) in Nigeria following a voice vote by delegates at the party National convention.

On 12 November 2019 Oshiomhole was suspended from APC after 18 Local Government Chairmen of the party in his native state of Edo passed a vote of no confidence on him.  He was accused of trying to disintegrate the party in Edo State. But a faction of the party loyal to Oshiomhole declared his suspension null and void and then suspended Governor Godwin Obaseki of the state whom they say orchestrated Oshiomhole's suspension. On 15 January 2020 Edo APC reaffirmed the suspension of Oshiomhole and said he had no legal right to continue to function as the APC National Chairman by the virtue of his suspension in Edo State. On 4 March 2020 a High Court sitting in Abuja ordered the suspension of Oshiomhole from office of the National Chairman of the APC that having been suspended from the party, Oshiomhole was no longer a member of the party and could not possibly continue to discharge his official responsibilities as national chairman with a clear order of the court that Oshiomhole be restricted to national secretariat of the party. Armed security agents including the Police, Department of State Service (DSS) and Civil Defense were heavily deployed to the secretariat to prevent Oshiomhole from entering. On 5 March 2020, a Federal High Court in Kano gave another judgment which vacated the judgement of the Federal Capital Territory (FCT) High Court and restored Oshiomhole as the National Chairman of the APC. This created confusion as to which judgment to obey because both courts (FCT High Court and Federal High Court Kano) are of equal jurisdiction and non of them could vacate the judgment of the other.
Oshiomole appealed against his suspension at the Abuja Court of Appeal and the court affirmed his suspension on 16 June 2020.
On 28 May 2022 Oshiomhole won the APC’s primaries  for the 2023 Edo North Senatorial Elections.

See also
List of Governors of Edo State

References

1953 births
Living people
Nigerian Roman Catholics
Governors of Edo State
Action Congress of Nigeria politicians
Edo State politicians
All Progressives Congress politicians
Nigerian trade unionists